The 2018–19 LNBP season was the 19th season of the Liga Nacional de Baloncesto Profesional, Mexico's top professional basketball league. It started in October 2018 with the first round of the regular season and ended in April 2019 with the last game of the finals, won by Fuerza Regia de Monterrey.

Teams
A total of 14 teams contest the league, including four new franchises.

Venues and locations

Personnel and sponsorship

Regular season

League table
North 

South

Playoffs

References

External links
 LNBP website

 
LNBP